The Borough of East St Leonards was a local government area in the Lower North Shore region of Sydney, New South Wales, Australia. First proclaimed as the "Municipality of East St Leonards" in 1860, following the passing of a new Municipalities Act became a Borough in 1867. It included the modern suburbs of Kirribilli, Milsons Point, Lavender Bay (part), North Sydney (part), Neutral Bay (part), Cremorne (part), Cremorne Point and Kurraba Point. The borough lasted until 29 July 1890 when it merged with the neighbouring boroughs of St Leonards and Victoria to form the Borough of North Sydney.

Council history
With the passing of The Municipalities Act, 1858, on 14 February 1860 residents of the eastern section of the St Leonards district petitioned the Colonial Government for the incorporation of the area as a "St Leonards East Municipality". This petition was subsequently accepted and the Governor of New South Wales, Sir William Denison, proclaimed the establishment of the "Municipality of East St Leonards" on 17 August 1860. 

Colonel George Barney, of Wotonga House, Kirribilli, was appointed as Returning Officer for the first election to be held at Dind's Hotel in Milsons Point on 13 September 1860. However, owing to "dissatisfaction caused by the limited extent of the municipal boundaries" the electors at the meeting refused to nominate anyone for the Council. As a result, while the Municipality de jure continued to exist, it was not until The Municipalities Act of 1867 came into effect in February 1868 that the Colonial Government tried again to elect a functioning council for the now-"Borough" of East St Leonards, with Frederic Lassetter appointed to conduct a new election.

The first council, comprising six Aldermen and two auditors, was first elected on 4 February 1868, and the first Mayor, William Tucker, was elected on 10 February. Dind's Hotel in Alfred Street, Milsons Point, acted as the Council Chambers until 1886 when the East St Leonards Town Hall, also on Alfred Street and designed by future mayor Walter Liberty Vernon, was completed. The foundation of the Town Hall was laid by former mayor, George Matcham Pitt, on 24 October 1885, and opened on 13 May 1886 by Sir Henry Parkes.

On 8 January 1889, Council was divided into four wards electing three Aldermen respectively: North, South, East and West Wards.

The Borough lasted until 29 July 1890 when it merged with the Borough of St Leonards (1867) and the Borough of Victoria (1871) to form the "Borough of North Sydney". The North Sydney Municipal Council first met in the 1885 East St Leonards Town Hall on Alfred Street, Milsons Point, using it until 1926.

Mayors

Council Clerks

References

External links
East St Leonards Council – Dictionary of Sydney

East St Leonards
East St Leonards
East St Leonards
East St Leonards
East St Leonards